The Toledo Bridge was located in Toledo, Iowa, United States. The Clinton Bridge and Iron Works of Clinton, Iowa built a single-span, pin-connected Pratt truss in 1912. The following year it became part of the Lincoln Highway route. It was listed on the National Register of Historic Places in 1998. The historic span was replaced by a concrete span in 2006, and removed from the National Register in 2009.

References

Bridges completed in 1912
Toledo, Iowa
Bridges in Tama County, Iowa
Former National Register of Historic Places in Iowa
Road bridges on the National Register of Historic Places in Iowa
National Register of Historic Places in Tama County, Iowa
Truss bridges in Iowa
Lincoln Highway
Pratt truss bridges in the United States